Henri Gaudier-Brzeska (né Gaudier; 4 October 1891 – 5 June 1915) was a French artist and sculptor who developed a rough-hewn, primitive style of direct carving.

Biography
Henri Gaudier was born in Saint-Jean-de-Braye near Orléans. In 1910, he moved to London to become an artist, even though he had no formal training. With him came Sophie Brzeska, a Polish writer over twice his age whom he had met at the Bibliothèque Sainte-Geneviève in Paris, and with whom he began an intense relationship, annexing her surname although they never married. (According to Jim Ede the linking of their names was never more than a personal arrangement.) During this time his conflicting attitudes towards art are exemplified in what he wrote to Dr. Uhlmayr, with whom he had lived the previous year:

"When I face the beauty of nature, I am no longer sensitive to art, but in the town I appreciate its myriad benefits—the more I go into the woods and the fields the more distrustful I become of art and wish all civilization to the devil; the more I wander about amidst filth and sweat the better I understand art and love it; the desire for it becomes my crying need."

He resolved these reservations by taking up sculpture, having been inspired by his carpenter father. Once in England Gaudier-Brzeska fell in with the Vorticism movement of Ezra Pound and Wyndham Lewis, becoming a founding member of the London Group. After coming under the influence of Jacob Epstein in 1912, he began to believe that sculpture should leave behind the highly finished, polished style of ancient Greece and embrace a more earthy direct carving, in which the tool marks are left visible on the final work as a fingerprint of the artist. Abandoning his early fascination for Auguste Rodin, he began to study instead extra-European artworks located in the British Museum and the Victoria and Albert Museum. As he was unable to afford the raw materials necessary to attempt projects on the scale of Epstein's Indian and Assyrian influenced pieces, he concentrated initially on miniaturist sculpture genres such as Japanese netsuke before developing an interest in work from West Africa and the Pacific Islands.

In 1913, he assisted with the illustrations of Haldane MacFall's book The Splendid Wayfaring along with Claud Lovat Fraser and Edward Gordon Craig.
In 1913 Henri Gaudier-Brzeska met Alfred Wolmark, the Jewish artist and modelled a bronze bust of the young artist, and the two remained close friends.

Gaudier-Brzeska's drawing style was influenced by the Chinese calligraphy and poetry which he discovered at the "Ezuversity", Ezra Pound's unofficial locus of teaching. Pound's interaction with Ernest Fenollosa's work on the Chinese brought the young sculptor to the galleries of Eastern art, where he studied the ideogram and applied it to his art. Gaudier-Brzeska had the ability to imply, with a few deft strokes, the being of a subject. His drawings also show the influence of Cubism.

At the start of the First World War, Gaudier-Brzeska enlisted with the French army. He appears to have fought with little regard for his own safety, receiving a decoration for bravery before being killed in the trenches at Neuville-St.-Vaast. During his time in the army, he sculpted a figure out of the butt of a rifle taken from a German soldier, "to express a gentler order of feeling"

Relationship with Sophie Brzeska

Gaudier met Sophie Brzeska, a Polish ex-governess twice his age, when he was only 18. Gaudier was an artist and Brzeska a novelist. Several books about Gaudier's work have been produced, but only the book Savage Messiah by H. S. Ede (Jim Ede) focuses on the relationship. A 1985 play by Una Flett, entitled Zosienka explored their relationship and age differences. In Ede's work, Brzeska was presented as more of a companion and her relationship with Gaudier resembled a co-dependency, since both suffered from clear mental health issues. Henri was devoted to Sophie, even taking her last name as his, but Sophie was often dismissive and cold towards Henri's romantic overtures (indeed, according to Ede they either never had sex, only did once or twice, or rarely did). They were often apart and Sophie would buy Henri prostitutes for his enjoyment instead of having relations with him.

Brzeska is often left out of accounts of Gaudier's life. Even Savage Messiah itself focuses on the artist and Brzeska is regarded with very little interest. Ken Russell's 1972 film of the book, however, changes the focus to Sophie and Henri Gaudier's relationship.

Following his death Sophie Brzeska became distraught, eventually dying in an asylum in 1925.

Legacy

Jim Ede bought a sizeable portion of Gaudier-Brzeska's work from Sophie Brzeska's estate after she died intestate. Her estate included numerous letters sent between Henri and Sophie. Ede used these as the basis for his book Savage Messiah on the life and work of Gaudier-Brzeska, which in turn became the basis of Ken Russell's film of the same name. The conclusion of the film peruses many of his sculptures and fully demonstrates what great art he produced in his short lifetime.

Despite the fact that he had only four years to develop his art, Gaudier-Brzeska has had a surprisingly strong influence on 20th-century modernist sculpture in England and France. His work is in the permanent collections at the Tate Gallery, Kettle's Yard, the Princeton University Art Museum, the Harvard Art Museums, the University of Michigan Museum of Art, the Museum of Modern Art, the Philadelphia Museum of Art, the Victoria and Albert Museum, the Museum of Fine Arts, Budapest, the Fine Arts Museums of San Francisco, the Metropolitan Museum of Art, the Huntington Library, the Museum of Fine Arts, Boston, the Musée National d'Art Moderne in Paris, and the Musée des Beaux-Arts d'Orléans, among others. 

The Nasher Museum of Art at Duke University held an exhibition entitled The Vorticists: Rebel Artists in London and New York, 1914–18 from 30 September 2010 through 2 January 2011, which included his work.

References

Sources
 (Reprinted 1970, New York City: New Directions) — Memoir of Pound's time with Gaudier-Brzeska, including letters and photos of sculpture.
 — Catalogue of an exhibition of the same name.

External links

 

 

 

1891 births
1915 deaths
Vorticists
Artists from Orléans
People from Fulham
French military personnel killed in World War I
20th-century French sculptors
French male sculptors
20th-century French painters